The Orchestre de Chambre de Lausanne (OCL, Lausanne Chamber Orchestra) is a Swiss chamber orchestra of around 40 musicians based in Lausanne, Switzerland. It has a vast repertoire, from the earliest baroque to contemporary premieres. The founder Victor Desarzens (1942-1973) was followed by Armin Jordan (1973—1985), then Lawrence Foster (1985-1990), Jesús López Cobos (1990-2000) and Christian Zacharias (2000-2013). From 2015 to 2020, Joshua Weilerstein continued the work of his predecessors while at the same time positioning the OCL for the 21st century, programming classical and contemporary pieces and using new media. In autumn 2021, the renowned French violinist and conductor Renaud Capuçon became the orchestra’s artistic director. 

The OCL has participated in the Festival of Aix en Provence since the second festival, has been a regular guest at the Enescu Festival in Bucharest, and has been invited by the Rostropovich Festival in Moscow. In addition to its tours in Germany and the USA, it has held several concerts at the Théâtre des Champs-Elysées in Paris, the BBC Proms in London, the Konzerthaus in Vienna, and the Berlin Philharmonie.

All through its history, the OCL has performed with international soloists such as Clara Haskil, Alfred Cortot, Walter Gieseking, Edwin Fischer, Murray Perahia, Radu Lupu, Martha Argerich, Nikolai Lugansky, Daniel Barenboim, Arthur Grumiaux, Frank Peter Zimmermann, Paul Tortelier, Truls Mørk, Jean-Pierre Rampal and Emmanuel Pahud. The OCL has also welcomed numerous conductors such as Paul Hindemith, Günter Wand, Christoph Eschenbach, Ton Koopman, Jeffrey Tate, Bertrand de Billy, Simone Young and Daniel Harding.

Discography

During the late 1970s, the OCL worked extensively with Philips Records. They recorded the complete surviving operas of Joseph Haydn, under the baton of Antal Doráti, entitled the "Eszterháza Opera Cycle". They have also recorded selected concertos by Ludwig van Beethoven, and the complete piano concertos and serenades of Wolfgang Amadeus Mozart, under Jesús López Cobos.

Artistic Directors
 Victor Desarzens (1942–1972)
 Armin Jordan (1973–1985)
 Lawrence Foster (1985–1990)
 Jesús López Cobos (1990–2000)
 Christian Zacharias (2000–2013)
 Joshua Weilerstein (2014–2021)
 Renaud Capuçon (2021- )

References
Quand l’Orchestre de Chambre de Lausanne descend dans le métro, RTS, 2 January 2014, accessed 16 November 2014
Notes

External links
 Official website
 Renaud Capuçon website

Musical groups established in 1942
Swiss orchestras
Chamber orchestras
1942 establishments in Switzerland
Lausanne
Erato Records artists